The National Taiwan University of Science and Technology abbreviated as NTUST or TaiwanTech, is a public technological university located in Taipei, Taiwan. TaiwanTech was established in 1974 as the National Taiwan Institute of Technology, as the first and the leading higher education institution of its kind within Taiwan's technical and vocational education system.

TaiwanTech enrolled 5,645 undergraduates and 4,744 graduate students, and employed 414 full-time faculties and about 318 staff members in 2013. The university’s 14 departments and 24 graduate programs are divided into the following 7 colleges,  College of Engineering, College of Electrical Engineering and Computer Science, School of Management, College of Design, College of Liberal Arts and Social Sciences, College of Intellectual Property Studies, and Honors College.

History
National Taiwan University of Science and Technology, formerly known as National Taiwan Institute of Technology, was established on 22 July 1974, as the first and the best higher education institution of its kind within the technological and vocational education system in Taiwan. By extending this system to the highest level, the university was intended to meet the need created by the rapid economic and industrial development for highly trained engineers and managers.

The university initially consisted of four departments, Industrial Management, Electronic Engineering, Mechanical Engineering, and Textile Engineering, in 1974. The department of Construction Engineering was added in 1975; and both the department of Chemical Engineering and Electrical Engineering were launched in 1976. The Master’s degree programs began in 1979, and the Ph.D. programs were offered in 1982. On attaining university status in 1997, the university reorganized itself into five colleges － Engineering,  Electrical and Computer Engineering, Management, Design, and Liberal Arts and Social Sciences. From the year 2001, certain departments also began to accept students into doctoral programs in the continuing education division.

After more than thirty years of growth and evolution, under the outstanding leadership of successive presidents, nowadays, the Taiwan Tech has become one of the 11 top universities in Taiwan, and has been recognized by all sectors of society for its academic and practical achievements in such areas as cooperation with industry, promotion of entrepreneurship and technology licensing. The university is considered the best technical university in Taiwan. The achievements made by the university in the technical and design departments has made it well recognized among the Asian universities as well. In July 2019, administrators at National Pingtung University of Science and Technology, National Yunlin University of Science and Technology, and NTUST stated that they would look into a merger of the three schools.

Presidents
Presidents of National Taiwan Institute of Technology
Chen Lu-an: August 1974 － January 1978
Mao Gao-wen : February 1978 － July 1981
Shih Yen-ping : August 1981 － July 1990
Liou Ching-tien : August 1990 － July 1997

Presidents of National Taiwan University of Science and Technology
 Liou Ching-tien : August 1997 － July 2000
 Chen Shi-shuenn (acting) : August 2000 － December 2000
 Chen Shun-tyan : December 2000 － January 2005
 Chen Shi-shuenn : February 2005 － January 2013
 Liao Chin-jong : February 2013 － January 2021
 Yen Jia-Yush : February 2021 － present

Campus

Main campus

The university has five campuses; the main campus, Gongguan Campus, is in the Daan District of Taipei City, and contains most teaching and researching buildings, library, athletic facilities, and the central administrative offices.

The Gongguan Campus, located at 43 Keelung Rd, Sec. 4, situated in southern Taipei, covers an area of about 10 hectares. It is about a 10-minute walk away from the Gongguan MRT (Mass Rapid Transit) Station.

Other campuses
The other four campuses are:
Tucheng Campus. Located in Tucheng District, New Taipei City. Approximately 5.7 hectares.
Keelung Campus. Located in Keelung. Approximately 10 hectares.
New Gongguan Campus. Located in the Daan District of Taipei City, near the main campus. Approximately 2.3 hectares.
Zhubei Campus. Located in Zhubei, Hsinchu County. Approximately 20.33 hectares.

Academics

Degrees
Taiwan Tech’s undergraduate division has two-year, four-year and continuing education programs. The two-year upper division program accepts graduates of technical junior colleges, while the four-year program seeks applicants from general and technical senior high schools. Continuing education programs are offered in the evenings by the Departments of Industrial Management, Electronic Engineering, Mechanical Engineering, Construction Engineering, and Applied Foreign Languages to those who are currently employed. Students who successfully complete the requirements in any of these three undergraduate programs are awarded a bachelor’s degree.

The Master’s degree programs began accepting students in 1979. Those with a bachelor’s degree or its equivalent in related fields from schools here or abroad are eligible to take the entrance exam. In addition, to encourage those already long in the workforce to advance their education, certain departments in the university also offer continuing education Master’s programs in the evening. Students in these graduate programs who have successfully completed all the requirements, including a thesis and defense, are awarded a Master’s degree.

The doctoral programs seek for holders of a Master’s degree or its equivalent from schools here or abroad. From the year 2001, certain departments also began to accept students into doctoral programs in the continuing education division. Students in any of these doctoral programs, who have successfully completed all the requirements, including a thesis and defense, are awarded the doctorate.

Colleges and departments
Taiwan Tech’s 14 departments and 24 graduate programs are organized into 7 colleges:
College of Engineering
Graduate Institute of Automation and Control
Department of Mechanical Engineering
Department of Materials Science and Engineering
Department of Construction Engineering
Department of Chemical Engineering
College of Electrical Engineering and Computer Science
Department of Electronic Engineering
Department of Electrical Engineering
Department of Computer Science and Information Engineering
Graduate Institute of Electro-Optical Engineering
School of Management
Graduate Institute of Management
Graduate Institute of Technology Management
EDBA/EMBA
Department of Industrial Management
Department of Business Administration
Graduate Institute of Finance
Department of Information Management
MBA
Graduate Institute of Technology Management
Management Undergraduate Honors Program
College of Design
Graduate Institute of Design
Department of Architecture
Department of Industrial and Commercial Design
College of Liberal Arts and Social Sciences
Graduate Institute of Digital Learning and Education
Department of Applied Foreign Languages
Department of Humanities and Social Sciences
Teacher Education Center
College of Applied Sciences
Graduate Institute of Applied Science and Technology
Graduate Institute of Biomedical Engineering
Graduate Institute of Color and Illumination Technology
Jing Cheng Department (University Inter-discipline Department)
College of Intellectual Property Studies
Graduate Institute of Patent

Rankings and achievements

Global rankings
Nation Taiwan University of Science and Technology is ranked 353 among world universities in the Times Higher Education-QS World University Rankings 2013 (subject ranking: Engineering/Technology: 143). The School of Management of Taiwan Tech is ranked 5th (Excellent Level)among the universities in Taiwan by eduniversal.com 2009.

The university is ranked 54 among Asian universities (subject ranking: Engineering/Technology: 33) in the Times Higher Education-QS World University Rankings 2013. NTUST Taiwan was also ranked as Asia's 10th best institute in science and technology.

iF Design Awards (Germany) - Famously known as the "Oscars of Design", with over 10,000 pieces of work from more than 50 countries enter every year. In Taiwan, it is a high quality proof of international competitiveness within design colleges and universities. Since 2011, the Department of Industrial and Communication Design of the National Taiwan University of Science and Technology has been ranked No. 1 by iF Design Award, four years in a row. The department alone had 14 pieces of Top 100 artwork in 2011, leading Taiwan Tech the title of 'single university earning the most awards' in iF record. To date, the department had nearly 40 pieces of artwork in the world's Top 100 record, including 2 in the Top 10 - Balance Stick (2011) and Size Zero Models (2013), alongside 2000 and 3000 Euros cash prize respectively.

A total of 702 research papers by Taiwan Tech faculty were published in both SCI and SSCI journals in 2009, subject ranked top 300 in the world and 7th in Taiwan nationally.

Taiwan domestic rankings
Taiwan Tech is one of 11 top universities in Taiwan sponsored by the Taiwan Ministry of Education’s (MOE) "Building Top Universities and Elite Research Centers Development Plan". Taiwan Tech is ranked as the best technical university in Taiwan, 4th in the Industry-University Cooperative Research Awards, and most graduate programs are ranked top 5th to 6th among national universities by the MOE".

Taiwan Tech is one of the top five Best Technology Licensing Centers declared by the National Science Council (NSC), 3rd in overall amount of NSC Technology Licensing funding, and 1st in the Technology Licensing individually allocated founding by the NSC. From 1994 to date, a total of 33 faculties received the Distinguished Research Awards from the NSC, ranked 6th in Taiwan. The university was the only university awarded the National Invention and Creation Award by the Ministry of Economic Affairs in 2007.

The university is ranked 6th most favorite university of the enterprises in Taiwan, 1st among the technical education system, according to the survey by 104 Job Bank and Global Views Monthly Magazine. Taiwan Tech’s graduates are chosen by Cheer’s Magazine as among the industry’s top six most-preferred students.

Student body
Taiwan Tech has a total enrollment of 10,389 students, of which 5,645 are at the undergraduate and 4,744 at the graduate and professional levels in 2013. Taiwan Tech awarded 1,285 undergraduate degrees, 1,387 Master’s degrees, and 117 doctoral degrees in 2009.

In the 2005-2006 school year, NTUST admitted four foreign students into a new English-based program in the Mechanical Engineering Department.  Since then, Taiwan Tech’s student body has grown to encompass 720 international students in 2013, representing over 45 counties. The numbers of students from Indonesia, Vietnam, India and Latin America are already large enough to form their own student associations. Indonesian students are the most populated among them.

Libraries and digital resources

Opened in March 1975, the Taiwan Tech library has an unbroken history of offering services for academic research and teaching resources. The library, with 5,132 square meters of floor space and about 630 seats in its reading facilities, encompasses two sections: acquisition and cataloguing section and periodical and circulation section.

The Taiwan Tech Library hold a collection of 240, 959 volumes of books, 2,933 titles of periodicals, 540,000 pieces of ERIC microfiches, and 180 titles of online databases. The full-text e-journal systems such as ABI/INFORM IEL, IEEE, ASP, SDOS services are also available.

In addition, the library offers automated circulation, reference services, reserved book services, interlibrary loan services, audio-visual lab services, and library orientation services. The library has also been interconnected with the NTUST network to ensure ease in library facilities like issuing books and downloading audio and video e-books.

Research centers and institutes
The research and development activities of Taiwan Tech are focused on research in basic science and applied science, as well as university-industry and international cooperation. Large-scale projects are conducted in building engineering, chemistry, computer engineering, electronics, information technology, and materials technology. They are facilitated by an inter-departmental and interdisciplinary approach, and thus enhance both academic research and teaching.

Currently, there are over 20 specialized research centers including:
Taiwan Information Security Center
The Commatrix (Advanced Design Center)
Opto-Mechatronics Technology Center
Communications & Electromagnetic Technology Center
Power Electronics Technology Center
Intelligent Robot Center
Ecological and Hazard Mitigation Engineering Research Center
Nanotechnology Engineering Center
Science and Technology Materials Center
Automation and Control Center
Center for Research in Technological and Vocational Education
Innovation and Creativity Center
Scientific Instrument Center
Center for the Study of Lotteries and Commercial Gaming
Construction Occupational Health & Safety Center
Facilities and Assets Management Center for Infrastructure
Building Energy Conservation Center
Building Hazard Mitigation Technology Center
Intelligent Building Center
Green Materials Center
Open Architecture Center
Computer Vision and Medical Imaging Center

In addition, the Office of Research and Development, including the University-Industry Cooperation Center, the Business Incubation Center, and the Technology Transfer Center (TTC), has been established to link research results with the needs of industry for development and applications.

Taiwan Building Technology Center
Among the universities chosen to receive a grant under the Ministry of Education’s Building Top Universities and Elite Research Centers Development Plan, NTUST was the only one to propose establishing a new research center which focuses on building-related issues. The Taiwan Building Technology Center (TBTC) seeks to integrate the humanities, the arts, and science and technology to enhance the positive impact that buildings can have on the safety and quality of people’s lives.

The TBTC has gathered outstanding researchers from Taiwan and abroad to pursue this goal through six research teams: the Intelligent Buildings Research Group, Building Structure and Hazard Mitigation Center, Green Building Materials Center, New Generation Building System Center, Steel Structure Engineering Center, and Building Energy Efficiency and Renewable Energy Center. These two groups focus on key technologies affecting buildings at each stage of their life-cycles. At the same time, the two groups also work on new building and ICT technologies that can create energy-conserving buildings with a reduced carbon footprint. In addition, the new TBTC building, currently under construction, will provide a real-world laboratory for testing and exhibiting the ideas and results of the Center’s projects, thus assisting the TBTC in taking its place on the world stage as a leading research center for intelligent green building technology.

EU-FP National Contact Point-Taiwan Office

The National Contact Point-Taiwan Office (NCP-Taiwan), established in Sep. of 2008, seeks to facilitate the engagement of Taiwanese universities, industry, research institutes and their researchers with the European Union's Seventh Framework Programme (FP7) and other related EU opportunities for mutual collaboration between the European Union and Taiwan. The aim of NCP-Taiwan is to increase the quality, quantity, profile and impact of Taiwan-EU research cooperation under FP7 by developing and executing a suite of activities such as info-days, seminars, exchange visits, technical assistance, workshops and other activities designed to increase the awareness of, and involvement in, new collaborative opportunities.

Research and Development Office

The Research and Development Office was established as a bridge between the university itself and government organizations and enterprises, with the aim of strengthening cooperative relationships. The office has three centers including the University-Industry Cooperation Center, the Business Incubation Center, and the Technology Transfer Center.

The aim of the University–Industry Cooperation Center is to facilitate interactions between Taiwan Tech and enterprises; to promote and share Taiwan Tech’s research achievements and drive for success with industry, and, most importantly, to synchronize Taiwan Tech’s research efforts with industry trends so as to reduce industry’s development cycle and to increase its research capacity effectively.

The Business Incubation Center seeks to integrate innovation technology, and to incubate enterprises for developing new products, businesses and technologies. Key functions have included creating the conditions for a space/satellite cluster, providing consultation in regard to business plans and the establishment of companies or factories, as well as supporting the development and registration of technology applications, providing business management and training programs, assisting with government funding applications, and helping with the development of publicity campaigns.

The Technology Transfer Center’s main objective is to fully develop the potential value of Taiwan Tech’s research achievements through effective technological marketing, and, by continuous interaction with industry, to promote competitiveness and technology development.

International cooperation

Taiwan Tech is actively engaged in various kinds of exchange programs, bringing students from abroad to take courses or engage in research work on the campus. On the faculty and administrative level, Taiwan Tech welcomes a large number of international scholars each year, including for long or short term faculty appointments, international conferences, seminars or lectures, research projects, or just to discuss establishing a cooperative relationship with their home institutions, thus adding to the list of 181 academic institutions on five continents throughout the world with which the university has signed such agreements.

Alumni
To date, a total of 56,511 students have graduated from the university’s undergraduate and graduate programs, of which 40,287 were at the undergraduate, 15,140 were at the Master’s program, and 1,084 were at the Ph.D. program. The majority of the alumni have devoted themselves to the various aspects of Taiwan’s economic development, to which many of them are making important contributions.

Gallery

See also
 Digital library
 List of universities in Taiwan

References

External links

 University official website 

NTUST. Retrieved 2010-04-26
 History
 University website

 
Educational institutions established in 1974
Universities and colleges in Taipei
Android (robot)
Technical universities and colleges in Taiwan
1974 establishments in Taiwan
Scientific organizations based in Taiwan